Zahir al-Din Nishapuri (died ) was a Persian writer and the author of the Saljuq-nama ("Book of Seljuk [Empire]"), an important source regarding the history of the Seljuk Empire. The life of Nishapuri is obscure; he is reported to have served as tutor of the previous Seljuk sultans, Ghiyath ad-Din Mas'ud and Arslan ibn Tughril (r. 1153). Although the Saljuq-nama is now lost, it was used as the primary source of the contemporary Persian historian Muhammad ibn Ali Rawandi.

References

Sources 
 

Scholars from the Seljuk Empire
1184 deaths
Year of birth unknown
12th-century Iranian writers